is a Japanese actress and voice actress from Gifu Prefecture. She is affiliated with Mausu Promotion.

Filmography

TV Anime
Mainichi Kaasan (2009-2012), Daichi-kun, Satoko-chan
Gaist Crusher (2013), Jinta Atō
Yu-Gi-Oh! Zexal II (2014), Guard Penguin, Buzzbuzz Seven
Senki Zesshō Symphogear GX (2015), Garie Tuman
Kamisama Minarai: Himitsu no Cocotama (2015), Mogutan
Flip Flappers (2016), Uexkull
Schwarzesmarken (2016), Sylvia Kschessinska
Space Patrol Luluco  (2016), Sucy Manbavaran 
Little Witch Academia (2017), Sucy Manbavaran
Megalobox (2018), Sachio
Keep Your Hands Off Eizouken! (2020), Art Club Kubo
Deca-Dence (2020), Jill
BNA: Brand New Animal (2020), Mary Itami
Megalobox 2: Nomad (2021), Sachio

Movies
Little Witch Academia (2013), Sucy Manbavaran
Little Witch Academia: The Enchanted Parade (2015), Sucy Manbavaran

Video Games
Little Witch Academia: Chamber of Time (2017), Sucy Manbavaran
League of Legends (2018), neeko

References

External links
 
 Official Agency Profile

Japanese voice actresses
Living people
Voice actresses from Gifu Prefecture
Year of birth missing (living people)
Mausu Promotion voice actors